Representative Cullom may refer to:
 Shelby Moore Cullom (1829-1914), US Representative from Illinois
 William Cullom (1810-1896), US Representative from Tennessee